Krista Vendy (born 1974) is an Australian actress who played teacher Teresa "Tess" Bell on the Australian soap opera Neighbours from 1999 to 2001.

Personal life
Vendy was born in Melbourne, Australia. Her mother Crystal is Austrian and her father David is Australian. Her brother, Simon Vendy, is a senior paramedic. Vendy is the cousin of Kristian Schmid, and was managed by Scott Michaelson, both of whom are past Neighbours stars.  Vendy resides in Los Angeles and Melbourne. Vendy dated actor William Hurt from 2006 to 2010. Vendy married Australian entrepreneur Brett Rogers in 2018.

Career
Since Neighbours Vendy has guest starred in television roles in Australia and the United States including, Blue Heelers, Shock Jock, Nightmares and Dreamscapes, Pizza, Leverage, Mental and Underbelly Files: Chopper. Film credits include, Love and Mortar, The Writer, Fat Pizza, Horseplay and The Incredible Hulk.

References

External links 

Living people
Australian people of Austrian descent
Australian television actresses
1974 births